is a former Japanese politician and a former chairman of the Parliamentary League for the Abolition of the Death Penalty.

Early life
He was born in the city of Shōbara in Hiroshima Prefecture into a poor family. He studied at the department of economics at University of Tokyo and worked his way through school through various jobs, including singing at a cabaret.

Upon graduation in 1960, he entered Sumitomo Seika, and joined the National Police Agency in 1962. In 1972, he took charge of a number of high-profile cases, including the Red Army Asama-Sanso incident, the Narita Airport incident, and the Tel Aviv highjacking. Kamei is one of the few major politicians to oppose the death penalty, and wrote a book, Shikei Haishi ron, asserting his opposition.

Political career
In 1977, he left the agency and received 3.5 million yen in severance pay, which he used to run for the Diet in Hiroshima. He was elected in 1979 as a member of the Liberal Democratic Party (LDP).

In 1989, he formed the Freedom Reform Alliance, criticizing the LDP's system of factions and strongly supported Shintarō Ishihara. He became Minister of Transport in 1994 and Minister of Construction in 1996. In 1998, he left the Mitsuzuka faction and formed the "Nakayama-Kamei group" with Minister of Foreign Affairs Taro Nakayama.

In 1999, he headed up the LDP's Policy Research Council and founded the Kamei faction. In 2003, he unsuccessfully ran for the position of Prime Minister against the incumbent, Junichiro Koizumi.

He opposed Koizumi's postal privatization plan and left the LDP in 2005, forming the Kokumin Shinto (People's New Party) with four other Diet members. Despite facing the popular businessman Takafumi Horie in the 2005 election, he won reelection for the tenth time.

On 16 September 2009, Kamei became the banking and postal services minister in the newly formed Hatoyama cabinet. Throughout the week, he voiced his commitment to providing economic stability for small companies, who he claimed "had lost vitality". He plans to provide a moratorium of up to three years on loan repayments and attempts to put a brake on what he perceives as excesses by financial and lending institutions.

Kamei decided not to run in the 2017 Japanese general election and therefore lost his seat in the House of Representatives.

Cultural references
He is sometimes humorously referred to as Shizuka-chan (where "chan" is a title usually reserved for young girls) after a female character in the manga Doraemon who shares his personal name.

The character "Takeo Tsuruta" in the manga Akumetsu is based on him.

Scandal
In August 2003, Kamei acknowledged receiving political donations from the leader of a group of loan sharks affiliated to the Yamaguchi-gumi, the largest known yakuza syndicate in Japan. The donor was Susumu Kajiyama.

Personal life
Kamei is a six-level blackbelt in Aikido and enjoys golf and oil painting. His niece Akiko is a current member of the House of Representatives.

See also

Capital punishment in Japan
Nobuto Hosaka

References

Further reading
, Shizuka Kamei, Publisher  , July 2002.

External links 
Official website (Japanese)

1936 births
Living people
Japanese anti–death penalty activists
Japanese police officers
Liberal Democratic Party (Japan) politicians
Members of the House of Representatives (Japan)
Ministers of Construction of Japan
Ministers of Transport of Japan
People from Hiroshima Prefecture
People's New Party politicians
Tomorrow Party of Japan politicians
University of Tokyo alumni
21st-century Japanese politicians
Politicians from Hiroshima Prefecture